Cyclotorna is a genus of moths, the sole one of family Cyclotornidae, with five recognized species, all endemic to Australia. This family and the closely related Epipyropidae are unique among the Lepidoptera in that the larvae are ectoparasites, the hosts in this case typically being leafhoppers, sometimes scale insects. The larvae of cyclotornids, however, leave the hemipteran host and become predatory on the brood in ant nests, apparently using chemical cues to induce the ants to carry the larvae into the ant nest.

References 

 
Ectoparasites
Parasites of insects
Parasitic insects
Zygaenoidea genera
Taxa named by Edward Meyrick